Lionel Malvyne Cox OAM (5 December 1930 – 9 March 2010) was an Australian Olympic track cyclist.

Career highlights

1948 – 49
1st N.S.W. 1000 metre Sprint Title
1949 – 50
1st N.S.W. 1000 metre Sprint Title
1950 – 51
1st Henson Park 5 mile Championship
1st N.S.W 1000 1 mile Sprint Championship
1950 – 51
1st N.S.W 1000 metre Sprint Championship
1st Henson Park 1 mile Championship
1st Australian 1 mile Championship
1951 – 52
1st N.S.W 1 mile Sprint Championship
1st N.S.W 1000 metre Sprint Championship
1st Dead Heat 1000 N.S.W Time Trial
2nd 1000 mere Australian Sprint Championship
1952
4th Grand Prix - Paris
Silver Medal (2nd) Olympic Sprint Championship – Helsinki, Finland 
Gold Medal (1st) Olympic Tandem Championship (Russell Mockridge) – Helsinki, Finland 
Top All Round Point Scorer - Denmark
1953
All Round International Point Scorer – Aaurnus, Denmark
3rd Grand Prix – Paris
1st Grand Prix – Hanover, Germany
1st Grand Prix – Aaurnus, Denmark
1st International Match Race – Aaurnus, Denmark
4th World Championships – Switzerland
4 Records broken, Denmark Amateur and Professional
Broke 1000 Sprint records – Denmark
Broke 1000 metre Sprint records – Odese, Denmark 11-7
1954
1st Victorian 1000 metre Sprint Championship
1st Victorian 1 mile Sprint Championship
1st Victorian 1000 metre Time Trial Championship
1955
1st N.S.W Time Trial Championship
1st N.S.W 1000 metre Sprint Championship

Professional career
Cox turned professional in 1956.

Return to amateur status and coaching
In 1958 Cox applied to be reinstated as an amateur and this was granted.  Cox coached at Camperdown and then Tempe, guiding riders to State, national and International success.

Honours and awards
In 1993 Cox was inducted into the Sports Australia Hall of Fame in recognition of his achievements for cycling.

In 1999, Cox was awarded the Medal of the Order of Australia (OAM) for his service to cycling particularly as a coach and a former competitor.

References

External links
 
 
 
 
 
 
 Lionel Cox eulogy at Cycling NSW
 

1930 births
2010 deaths
Australian male cyclists
Cyclists at the 1952 Summer Olympics
Deaths from pneumonia in New South Wales
Olympic cyclists of Australia
Olympic gold medalists for Australia
Olympic silver medalists for Australia
Cyclists from Brisbane
Sportsmen from Queensland
Australian track cyclists
Recipients of the Medal of the Order of Australia
Olympic medalists in cycling
Sport Australia Hall of Fame inductees
Medalists at the 1952 Summer Olympics
20th-century Australian people